Dmitriyevka is a rural locality (a selo) and the administrative centre of Dmitriyevsky Selsoviet, Ufimsky District, Bashkortostan, Russia. The population was 4351 as of 2010. There are 37 streets.

Geography 
Dmitriyevka is located 17 km northwest of Ufa (the district's administrative centre) by road. Yasny is the nearest rural locality.

References 

Rural localities in Ufimsky District